The Corrupted is a 2019 British crime thriller film directed by Ron Scalpello from a screenplay by Nick Moorcroft. The film stars Sam Claflin, Timothy Spall, Hugh Bonneville, Naomi Ackie, Cathal Pendred, Shaun Dooley, Charlie Murphy, Noel Clarke and David Hayman, and follows an ex-convict who tries to win back the trust of his family after losing everything to a local crime syndicate.

Cast
 Sam Claflin as Liam McDonagh, an ex-convict
 Jack Veal as young Liam
 Timothy Spall as Clifford Cullen, the leader of a local crime syndicate
 Hugh Bonneville as Anthony Hammond
 Cathal Pendred as Gerry Dwyer
 Shaun Dooley as Eamonn
 Charlie Murphy as DC Gemma Connelly
 Noel Clarke as DS Neil Beckett
 David Hayman as DCI Raymond Ellery
 Lorraine Ashbourne as Pam Cullen, wife of Clifford Cullen
 Adam Long as Warren Byford
 Joe Claflin as Sean McDonagh
 Naomi Ackie as Grace, Liam's wife
 Aled Arhyel as Archie, Liam's son
 George Russo as DI Frank Walsh
 Don Gilet as DI Graham Patterson
 Alec McKenna as Isaac Gale
 Decca Heggie as Jonjo Dixon
 Sam Otto as Nayan Khaliq
 Linal Haft as Albert Grimes
 Silas Carson as Mayor Ahmad 
 Kirsty Hoiles as probation officer
 Jo Dyson as Mrs Byford
 Shaun Dooley as Eamonn McDonagh
 Simon Chandler as Andrew Reid, Dy Asst Commissioner
 Nya Summer as Jodie Connelly
 Andrei Satalov as Besmir Rugova

Production

Development
On 20 June 2017, Eclipse Global Entertainment announced Ron Scalpello as director on their website.

Casting
On 5 February 2018, it was announced that Sam Claflin had joined the cast alongside Timothy Spall. Hugh Bonneville, David Hayman and Naomi Ackie were also added. On 16 March 2018, Noel Clarke was cast as a police detective.

Filming
Principal photography commenced on 16 March 2018 in various locations around London, United Kingdom. Some filming took place on the Dartford area of the North Kent Marshes in Kent as the setting of a crime scene.

Release
The film was released theatrically in the United Kingdom on 10 May 2019 by Entertainment Film Distributors. The theatrical trailer and poster were released on 5 April 2019.

References

External links
 

2019 films
2019 crime thriller films
2010s mystery thriller films
British crime thriller films
British mystery thriller films
Films set in 2012
Films set in London
Films shot in Kent
Films shot in London
2010s English-language films
2010s British films